"Stop" is a song by Swiss recording artist Stefanie Heinzmann. It was written by Kim Sanders, Michel Zitron, Marek Pompetzki, and Paul NZA for her second studio album, Roots to Grow (2009). while production was helmed by Pompetzki and NZA. The song was released as the album's second single along with "Unbreakable".

References

External links
  
 

2009 singles
2009 songs
Stefanie Heinzmann songs